Wide Open may refer to:

Places 
 The great wide open, any rural area with long vistas and low population
 Wideopen or Wide Open, a village in North Tyneside, Tyne & Wear
 Wideopen Islands, a group of islands off the coast of the Antarctic Peninsula
 East Wideopen and West Wideopen, islands of the inner Farne Islands

Music

Albums
 Wide Open (Jason Aldean album) or the title song, 2009
 Wide Open (Michael McDonald album), 2017
 Wide Open (Sawyer Brown album) or the title song, 1988
 Wide Open (Weaves album) or the title song, 2017
 Wide Open, by Austin French, 2018
 Wide Open, by Kahvas Jute, 1971
 Wide Open, by Latch Key Kid, 2010
 Wide Open, an EP by Skids, 1978

Songs
 "Wide Open", by Brick, 1981
 "Wide Open", by the Chemical Brothers from Born in the Echoes, 2015
 "Wide Open", by Mike Posner from A Real Good Kid, 2019
 "Wide Open", by Wafia, Ta-ku, and Masego, 2021 
 "Wide Open", by Westlife from Greatest Hits, 2011

Other uses
 Wide Open (film), a 1930 film starring Edward Everett Horton
 "Wide Open" (Millennium), a television episode
 Wide Open (novel), a 1998 novel by Nicola Barker

See also
 
 Great Wide Open
 Into the Great Wide Open
 Wide Open Spaces (disambiguation)
 Wide open throttle